Charles Sackett Sydnor (July 21, 1898 - March 2, 1954) was a history professor and author in the United States. He was born in Augusta, Georgia.

He wrote 23 biographical sketches for the Dictionary of American Biography.

The Southern Historical Association gives out an award named for him. Duke University has a collection of his papers.

Writings
Slavery in Mississippi (1933)
 A Gentleman of the Old Natchez Region: Benjamin L. C. Wailes (1938)
The Development of Southern Sectionalism, 1818–1848 (1948)
Gentlemen Freeholders: Political Practices in Washington's Virginia (1952)
American Revolutionaries in the Making (1965)

References

1898 births
1954 deaths
20th-century American historians
Writers from Augusta, Georgia
American biographers